Charles Arthur Niebergall (May 23, 1899 – August 29, 1982) was an American professional baseball catcher and scout. He appeared in 54 major league games over three seasons for the St. Louis Cardinals. Niebergall was one of a number of baseball players in the first half of the 20th century to be nicknamed "Nig", being referred to as such in newspaper reports as early as June 1923.

Niebergall spent the entire 1924 season with the Cardinals, playing in 40 games (17 as starting catcher) and batting .293.  All told, he had 21 major-league hits, with eight doubles and eight runs batted in. He played in the minor leagues for all or part of 14 seasons between 1920 and 1935, and scouted for the Boston Red Sox after his playing career ended.

References

External links

1899 births
1982 deaths
Boston Red Sox scouts
Charleston Senators players
Jersey City Skeeters players
Major League Baseball catchers
Montreal Royals players
Baseball players from New York City
Peoria Tractors players
St. Louis Cardinals players
Springfield Ponies players
Syracuse Stars (AA) players
People from Holiday, Florida
American expatriate baseball players in Canada
Buffalo Bisons (minor league) players